Clarence Hawkins (born July 15, 1956) is a former American football running back. He played for the Oakland Raiders in 1979.

References

1956 births
Living people
American football running backs
Florida A&M Rattlers football players
Oakland Raiders players